Kfar Kidde is a town in Northern Lebanon, roughly 51 km North of Beirut.  It is in the Byblos District of Keserwan-Jbeil Governorate, located along the Mediterranean coast.

Notes

Populated places in Byblos District